Auf Wiedersehen is an album by pianist Red Garland which was recorded in 1971 and released on the MPS label in 1975.

Reception

The AllMusic review by Ken Dryden stated "Red Garland returned to the recording studio in 1971, after a layoff of nearly nine years, to record this trio set for MPS. Accompanied by bassist Sam Jones and drummer Roy Brooks, Garland is in great form".

Track listing
All compositions by Red Garland except where noted.
 "Hobo Joe" (Joe Henderson) – 8:38
 "Auf Wiedersehen" – 6:26
 "A Night in Tunisia" (Dizzy Gillespie) – 6:53
 "Old Stinky Butt" – 9:40
 "Stella by Starlight" (Victor Young, Ned Washington) – 4:54
 "Daahoud" (Clifford Brown) – 6:16

Personnel
Red Garland – piano
Sam Jones – bass
Roy Brooks – drums

References

MPS Records albums
Red Garland albums
1975 albums
Albums produced by Don Schlitten